Lewis Jones may refer to:

Lewis Jones (Australian footballer) (1883–1960), Australian rules footballer
Lewis Jones (bishop) (1542–1646), Bishop of Killaloe
Lewis Jones (footballer, born 1994), British footballer
Lewis Jones (Patagonia) (1836–1904), one of the founders of the Welsh settlement in Patagonia who gave his name to the town of Trelew
Lewis Jones (politician) (1884–1968), British politician, MP for Swansea West, 1931–1945
Lewis Jones (Royal Navy officer) (1797–1895)
Lewis Jones (rugby) (born 1931), Welsh rugby union, and rugby league footballer of the 1940s, 1950s and 1960s
Lewis Jones (rugby player born 1992), Welsh rugby union scrum-half
Lewis Jones (rugby league), rugby league footballer of the 2010s
Lewis Jones (writer) (1897–1939), Welsh writer
Lewis Bevel Jones III (1926–2018), bishop of the United Methodist Church
Lewis Brian Hopkin Jones (1942-1969), founder of The Rolling Stones
Lewis Ralph Jones (1864–1945), American botanist and agricultural biologist
Lewis Wade Jones (1910–1979), sociologist and educator
Lewis Webster Jones (1899–1975), American economist
G. Lewis Jones (1907–1971), Assistant Secretary of State for Near Eastern and South Asian Affairs, 1959–1961
Lewis Jones (by 1519-67/69), MP for Leominster
Lewis Jones (NASCAR), NASCAR driver who won in relief of Bob Welborn

See also
Louis Jones (disambiguation)